John Turner (18071847) was an American fur trapper and guide who first entered Oregon Country in 1828 and became an early resident of the Willamette Valley. Later he moved to California where he was part of the second attempt to rescue the Donner Party.

Early life
Turner was born in Madison County, Kentucky in the year 1807 to parents Smithton Turner and Nancy Ragsdale. By 1823 he was working in the fur trade in the Rocky Mountains.

Mojave and Umpqua Massacres
At the 1827 rendezvous on the southern shore of Bear Lake, Jedediah Smith assembled a party of 18 fur trappers and two Native American women to accompany him on a return trip to California. Turner joined the group, and they headed southwest, essentially retracing Smith's route the year before. While Smith's party crossed the Colorado River at the 35th parallel, a hostile group of Mohave attacked, killing ten trappers and capturing the two women. The surviving men, including Smith and Turner, eventually met up with the group that had previously traveled with Smith to California, and after many additional setbacks, a party of 18 continued north into the Oregon Country, being joined along the way by an Indian boy they called Marion.

In June 1828 the party began trading with the Lower Umpqua people, a Native American community known to early writers as the Kalawatset. On the morning of July 14, 1828, Smith, Turner, Richard Leland, and a Kalawatset were off in a canoe searching for an overland route north when their camp was attacked. The three avoided the attack and made their way north to Fort Vancouver  When they arrived after 28 days, they found that another member of their party, Arthur Black, had survived the attack and had arrived two days earlier. It was later confirmed that 15 men died in the attack including Marion, the Indian boy.  Turner was the only man besides Smith to have survived both massacres.

Hudson's Bay Company and Tututni Massacre

The four survivors stayed at Fort Vancouver until the spring of 1829, when Smith and Black left to return to the Rocky Mountain region. Turner and LeLand stayed behind and Turner joined up with Hudson's Bay Company (HBC) to guide trapping forays into California.  In 1832, while accompanying a 163-member party led by Michel Laframboise in California, he met Ewing Young, quit the HBC and enlisted with Young.

In June 1835 Turner was leading a small band of eight pioneers from California to Oregon. The group included William J. Bailey and George K. Gay. and a woman and two children thought to be Turner's Native American family. The pioneers were attacked at the Rogue River by a community of Native Americans known as the Tututni. Turner grabbed a large burning log during his escape, and fought off the attackers. Only Turner, Woodsworth, Bailey, and Gay survived.

Willamette Cattle Company
In 1837 Turner accompanied a group of eleven Oregon pioneers, including Gay and Bailey, known as the Willamette Cattle Company on a cattle drive to bring several hundred head of cattle from California to the Willamette Valley, under the direction of Ewing Young. The party sailed to California, purchased 729 head of cattle and some horses, and began herding the cattle north.  The journey was arduous, and the company resented Young.  Turner, Gay and Bailey were bent on revenge for the Tututni massacre, and Gay cold-bloodedly shot an Indian.  After that, Indians plagued the party, shooting arrows into the stock.  With attrition along the route, they delivered 630 cattle to the Willamette Valley settlement.

Memorial of 1838
In the 1830s, settlers in the Willamette Valley petitioned the United States Congress to take an active role in promoting American interests in the Oregon Country. The Hudson's Bay Company had established a form of government loyal to British interests, and although the Americans in the Willamette Valley were not subjects of British rule, many desired that the United States exert legal and military control over the land. The petition, known as the Memorial of 1838, was prepared by Jason Lee and signed by 36 Willamette Valley settlers. Last among the signers was John Turner.

The Memorial of 1838 preceded the Champoeg Meetings by three years. Mack and Meaghers counted Turner among the creators of the Provisional Government of Oregon at Champoeg, although he is not listed among the voters.

Move to California and the second rescue attempt of the Donner Party
After the Willamette Valley settlers created the Provisional Government, Turner sold his property to John Phillips for $100 and moved to California.

In 1847 Turner participated in the second rescue attempt of the Donner Party.

Epitaphs
In his remarks at the tenth annual reunion of the Oregon Pioneer Association in 1882, association president  J. W. Nesmith stated, "The old Kentucky giant, John Turner, so well known and famed for his herculean strength, good nature, quaint oddities and dauntless courage, through the Rocky mountains, New Mexico, California and Oregon, from 1823 to 1847, was killed in the latter year in California by the accidental discharge of his own rifle."

Turner's Oregon Pioneer Registry card at the Oregon Historical Society states, "Born Kentucky. Came to Oregon 1828 from Missouri. Died 1847. Was with Jedediah S. Smith's Trapping of party of 18 in 1828; in July of that year all but two of his companions were killed by Indians near the mouth of the Umpqua River; he began trapping in 1823 and continued in Rocky Mountains, Oregon, New Mexico and California until 1847, when he accidentally shot himself.

Notes

References

Further reading
 
 
 Dobbs, Men of Champoeg (Metropolitan Press, 1932)

External links
 Traders and Trappers, Index of names of notable figures in the fur trade
 Oregon Trail Timeline 1831-1840

1807 births
1847 deaths
Champoeg Meetings
People from Madison County, Kentucky
Oregon pioneers
Burials in California
Mountain men